was an amusement park located in the town of Misaki in Osaka Prefecture, Japan, operated by Nankai Electric Railway Co., Ltd. The park was opened on April 1, 1957, as the 70th anniversary of Nankai Railway.

Park outline
The park consisted of an amusement park, a zoo, a dolphin show venue, and a large outdoor pool. The outdoor pool was opened only in summer.

The park was near Misaki-koen Station on the Nankai Main Line.

Access
Misaki Park was located near the Misaki-kōen Station of the Nankai Main Line, of which is also operated by Nankai Electric Railway.

References

External links

Official website 

Amusement parks in Japan
Tourist attractions in Osaka Prefecture
Buildings and structures in Osaka Prefecture
1957 establishments in Japan
Nankai Group
2020 disestablishments in Japan
Misaki, Osaka